The 2004 FIM Sidecarcross World Championship, the 25th edition of the competition, started on 21 March 2004 and finished after fourteen race weekends on 5 September 2004 with Daniël Willemsen and Kaspars Stupelis taking out the title once more. For Willemsen, it was his third world championship while it was the second for Stupelis.

The season saw the cancellation of the Russian GP in Moscow on 15 August because of heavy rainfall, thereby reducing the schedule to thirteen GP's and 26 races.

Overview
The 2004 season was the 25th edition of the Sidecarcross World Championship. It resulted in a third world championship for Daniël Willemsen, his second in a row with passenger Kaspars Stupelis. Five time world champion Kristers Sergis, with Sven Verbrugge as his passenger, was their main rival early on in the competition. An injury to Sergis meant however, the pair would miss five race weekends and be out of contention for the championship. After this, Willemsen and Stupelis won the championship almost undisputed with second-placed Marko Happich more than 150 points behind in second place. For the following season, 2005, Willemsen and Sergis would exchange passenger, with Sven Verbrugge returning to Willemsen, who he had raced with before, while Sergis and Stupelis would form an all-Latvian team.

The fourteen GP's of the season were held in eleven countries, Spain, France (2x), Netherlands, Germany (2x), Italy, Estonia, Latvia (2x), Croatia, Bulgaria, Russia and Belgium. It was the first time that a GP was to be held in Russia.

Format
Every Grand Prix weekend is split into two races, both held on the same day. This means, the 2004 season with its fourteen Grand Prix had originally 28 races. Each race lasts for 30 minutes plus two laps. The two races on a weekend actually get combined to determine an overall winner. While this overall winners receives no extra WC points, they usually are awarded a special trophy.

The first twenty teams of each race score competition points. The point system for the 2004 season was as follows:

Retirements
At the end of the 2004 season a number of long-term competitors retired from the World Championship, the most successful of those being Estonian Are Kaurit, with a third place in 2004 as his best result and active since 1993, and Dutch Wilfred van Werven, third placed in 2002 and 2003 and active since 1996.

Calendar
The calendar for the 2004 season:

 The Sidecarcross des Nations is a non-championship event but part of the calendar and is denoted by a light blue background in the table above.
 Flags for passengers not shown.
 1 Cancelled after heavy rain, only an exhibition race was held, won by Marco Happich / Thomas Weinmann, which didn't count towards the world championship.

Classification

Riders
Out of 56 teams in the points, the top-twenty of the 2004 season were:

 Equipment listed is motor and frame.

References

External links 
 The World Championship on Sidecarcross.com
 The John Davey Grand Prix Pages – Results of all GP's up until 2005
 FIM Sidecar Motocross World Championship 2010

Sidecarcross world championship, 2004
Sidecarcross World Championship seasons